Olivia Laing (born 14 April 1977) is a British writer, novelist and cultural critic. She is the author of four works of non-fiction, To the River, The Trip to Echo Spring, The Lonely City, and Everybody, as well as an essay collection, Funny Weather, and a novel, Crudo. In 2018, she was awarded the Windham-Campbell Literature Prize for non-fiction and in 2019, the 100th James Tait Black Memorial Prize for Crudo. In 2019 she became an elected Fellow of the Royal Society of Literature.

Early life and education 
Olivia Laing grew up in Chalfont St. Peter, Buckinghamshire. She enrolled at Sussex University to study English, but dropped out to live on a road protest in Dorset. At the age of 20, she spent three months living alone on an abandoned farm near Brighton, an experience she has described as being formative. In her twenties, Laing trained as a medical herbalist.

Career 
Between 2007 and 2009, Laing was Deputy Books Editor of The Observer. She writes on art and culture for The Guardian, frieze and New Statesman and has written catalogue essays for many contemporary artists, including Derek Jarman, Chantal Joffe, Wolfgang Tillmans and Andy Warhol.

Laing is the author of four books of nonfiction, each mixing cultural criticism and memoir with elements of biography, psychoanalysis, and travel writing. Her first book, To the River: A Journey Beneath the Surface, was published in 2011. Walking the length of the Ouse, the river in which Virginia Woolf drowned in 1941, Laing reflects upon Woolf's life and work and, more generally, upon the relationship between history and place, and the difficulties of biography. The book was shortlisted for the Ondaatje Prize and the Dolman Best Travel Book Award.

The Trip to Echo Spring: On Writers and Drinking (2013), a finalist for both the Costa Biography Award and the Gordon Burn Prize, employs a similar tack. Travelling across America, Laing explores the difficult relationship between creativity and alcoholism, placing her own experience growing up in an alcoholic family alongside the lives of male alcoholic writers such as John Cheever, F. Scott Fitzgerald, Raymond Carver and Ernest Hemingway. In the book, she praises literature's "power to map the more difficult regions of human experience and knowledge". According to the judges of the Windham-Campbell Prize, "this power to map the difficult, the shameful, and the grotesque, as well as the beautiful and transcendent, is inherent in her own work".

Her third book, The Lonely City: Adventures in the Art of Being Alone, was aided by research Laing undertook as a recipient of the 2014 Eccles British Library Writer Award and was published in 2016. It was shortlisted for the Gordon Burn Prize and the National Book Critics Circle Award for Criticism. It has been translated into eighteen languages. Examining her own experience of solitude during a period living in New York, Laing considers how the culturally stigmatised condition of loneliness provides new insights into the work of numerous artists for whom the creative act became a means of exploring solitude and forging companionship, among them Andy Warhol, Edward Hopper, Henry Darger and David Wojnarowicz. The result is a merging of inner and outer realities, a revelatory exploration of the intense feelings of shame that loneliness can provoke as well as a vivid portrait of 1970s and 1980s New York at the peak of the AIDS crisis.

Laing's first novel, Crudo, is a roman-à-clef about the politically turbulent summer of 2017. Written in real time over seven weeks, the novel is also an homage to Kathy Acker, on whom the protagonist is based. It was a New York Times Notable Book of 2018, and was shortlisted for the Gordon Burn Prize and the Goldsmiths Prize. In 2019, Crudo won the 100th James Tait Black Memorial Prize. According to the fiction judge, Dr Alex Lawrie: "This is fiction at its finest: a bold and reactive political novel that captures a raw slice of contemporary history with pace, charm, and wit." Writing in The New Yorker, Alexandra Schwartz described Crudo as "a work of autofiction that captures the apprehension of the present moment." In New Statesman, Sarah Ditum wrote that Laing "uses her style like a magician uses sleight-of-hand, palming away a hinted-at revelation while your attention has been directed towards the dazzling arc of her sentences".

Funny Weather: Art in an Emergency was published in 2020. It is a collection of essays, reviews and other published work that Laing wrote for a variety of publications including frieze, BOMB and The Guardian.

Laing's sixth book, Everybody, examines the body and its discontents by way of the renegade psychoanalyst Wilhelm Reich. It explores the liberation movements of the twentieth century, examining the work and lives of a variety of figures, including Nina Simone, Susan Sontag, Andrea Dworkin and Malcolm X. According to the Financial Times, "Laing's gift for weaving big ideas together with lyrical prose sets her alongside the likes of Arundhati Roy, John Berger and James Baldwin. In other words, she is among the most significant voices of our time."

Personal life 
Laing is married to the poet and academic Ian Patterson. She identifies as trans/non-binary.

Awards and honors 
2014 Eccles British Library Writers Award
2018 Windham–Campbell Literature Prize
2019 James Tait Black Memorial Prize - Crudo

Publications

Non-fiction 
 To the River: A Journey Beneath the Surface (Canongate, 2011)
The Trip to Echo Spring: On Writers and Drinking (Canongate, 2013)
The Lonely City: Adventures in the Art of Being Alone (Canongate, 2016)
Funny Weather: Art in an Emergency (Picador, 2020)
Everybody: A Book About Freedom (Picador, 2021)

Fiction 
Crudo (Picador, 2018)

References

External links 
 Author website
 ft.com
 Guardian review of Crudo
 New Statesman review of The Lonely City
 Observer review of The Trip to Echo Spring
 An interview with Olivia Laing, buzzfeed

1977 births
Living people
21st-century British novelists
21st-century British non-fiction writers
New Statesman people
People from Chalfont St Peter
James Tait Black Memorial Prize recipients
Fellows of the Royal Society of Literature